The following is a list of the 19 cantons of the Cher department, in France, following the French canton reorganisation which came into effect in March 2015:

 Aubigny-sur-Nère
 Avord
 Bourges-1 
 Bourges-2 
 Bourges-3 
 Bourges-4 
 Chârost
 Châteaumeillant
 Dun-sur-Auron
 La Guerche-sur-l'Aubois
 Mehun-sur-Yèvre
 Saint-Amand-Montrond
 Saint-Doulchard
 Saint-Germain-du-Puy
 Saint-Martin-d'Auxigny
 Sancerre
 Trouy
 Vierzon-1
 Vierzon-2

References